The Widow's Ball is a 1930 German comedy film directed by Georg Jacoby and starring Lucie Englisch, Fritz Kampers, and Sig Arno.

The film's sets were designed by the art director Franz Schroedter.

Cast
Lucie Englisch as Frieda
Fritz Kampers as Fritz Petzold
 as Lotte Petzold
Sig Arno as Kiebitz
Henry Bender as Herr Liesegang
Lydia Potechina as Frau Liesegang
Otto Wallburg as Teckelmann
 as Mann mit dem Mops

References

External links

1930 comedy films
Films of the Weimar Republic
German comedy films
Films directed by Georg Jacoby
German black-and-white films
1930s German films